= Stone Story RPG =

Stone Story RPG is an indie role-playing video game developed by Brazilian developer Gabriel Santos under the studio name Martian Rex. The game features animated ASCII art graphics and a semi-automated gameplay structure combining role-playing, incremental, and strategy elements. It was released in Steam Early Access for Microsoft Windows on August 8, 2019, and reached a full release for Windows, macOS, and Linux on July 26, 2023. Mobile versions for iOS and Android were released later in 2023.

== Gameplay ==
Stone Story RPG is a single-player side-scrolling role-playing game in which the player character moves and attacks automatically. Player interaction centers on equipment management, crafting, item usage, and higher-level strategic decisions rather than direct control of movement or combat.

The game’s visual presentation is rendered entirely using animated ASCII characters for environments, characters, and effects. Reviewers have compared the presentation to earlier text-based and ASCII games, implemented using modern rendering techniques within the Unity engine.

A core mechanic is Stonescript, an in-game scripting system that allows players to write simple scripts to automate character behavior, modify combat routines, and customize aspects of gameplay. Stonescript becomes increasingly relevant in later stages of the game and has been described by the developer as a player-facing automation tool.

== Development ==
Development of Stone Story RPG began in 2014. Gabriel Santos initially experimented with ASCII-based animation in an unrelated prototype before reworking the concept into a fantasy role-playing game. Public development updates were shared on indie development forums during production.

The game was developed using the Unity engine. In interviews, Santos stated that the ASCII art was created frame-by-frame as text and rendered in-engine using custom shaders. During development, the visual presentation was changed from black-on-white to white-on-black following playtesting and feedback.

Stone Story RPG was Santos’s primary project following the release of Ki Pets (2015), a mobile virtual pet game also developed by Martian Rex.

== Release ==
Stone Story RPG launched in Steam Early Access on August 8, 2019. The Early Access period lasted nearly four years, during which additional content and systems were added. Version 1.0 was released on July 26, 2023.

Mobile versions for iOS and Android were released in 2023 using a free-to-play model supported by optional in-app purchases. The PC version is sold as a premium title.

== Reception ==
Stone Story RPG received generally positive reviews from critics. Coverage frequently focused on the game’s ASCII art presentation, automation-focused design, and hybridization of idle and role-playing mechanics. Some reviewers noted that progression could become repetitive due to grinding, while others highlighted the gradual introduction of systems such as Stonescript.

The game was nominated for Excellence in Visual Art at the Independent Games Festival in 2020. It also won the Grand Audience Award at Tokyo Game Show’s Sense of Wonder Night in 2019 and received the TIGA Award for Best Role-Playing Game in 2019.

As of 2023, the game holds a “Very Positive” user rating on Steam based on several thousand user reviews.

== Future projects ==
In developer announcements published on Steam in 2025, Martian Rex stated that it is preparing a Kickstarter campaign for Stone Story Ascension, described as a continuation or expansion of Stone Story RPG. As of the announcement, the project had not yet launched and no release date had been confirmed.
